Pavel Georgiev Panov (16 September 1950 – 18 February 2018) was a Bulgarian football player and coach, who played as a midfielder or striker.

Career
Panov started his career with Septemvri Sofia in 1963 and stayed there until 1968.

In 1969, he moved to Spartak Sofia. After the forceful union of Levski Sofia with Spartak in the late 1969 he became one of the best players in blue. In Levski he stayed twelve seasons, playing in 301 games and scoring 130 goals in the Championship. He played in forty-four games and scored thirteen goals for the Bulgarian National team with which he played in the World Cup tournament in 1974.

With 22 goals Panov is the Third highest all-time Bulgarian goalscorer in European club competitions, after Hristo Stoichkov and Dimitar Berbatov. Quarterfinalist for the Cup Winners' Cup in 1970 and 1977 and also for the UEFA Cup in 1976. One of the biggest Bulgarian players of the 1970s. Master of the free kicks. He also played for Aris FC before finishing his career in Haskovo. He coached Levski in 1986–1987 and again in 1989–1990. He also coached Iwuanyanwu Nationale, Bulgaria's national youth side, Botev Plovdiv, Septemvri, Lokomotiv Sofia. He was president of Levski's Sport-technical board.

Awards

Levski Sofia

Bulgarian champion: 1969–1970, 1973–1974, 1976–1977, 1978–1979
Bulgarian Cup winner: 1969–1970, 1970–1971, 1975–1976, 1976–1977, 1978–1979

Individual

Best goal scorer in Bulgaria in 1976 (18 goals) and 1977 (20 goals)
Bulgarian Footballer of the Year in 1977

International

UEFA Euro Under-19 Champion with Bulgaria: 1969
Balkan Cup Champion with Bulgaria: 1976

Coach

Cup of the Soviet Army winner with Levski: 1987

References

External links

 
 Player Profile at LevskiSofia.info

1950 births
2018 deaths
Bulgarian footballers
Bulgaria international footballers
Bulgarian expatriate footballers
FC Septemvri Sofia players
PFC Levski Sofia players
Aris Thessaloniki F.C. players
FC Haskovo players
Super League Greece players
Expatriate footballers in Greece
Bulgarian expatriate sportspeople in Greece
1974 FIFA World Cup players
First Professional Football League (Bulgaria) players
Bulgarian football managers
Botev Plovdiv managers
PFC Levski Sofia managers
Association football forwards
Footballers from Sofia